Isabella Lewis (born 16 November 2002) is an Australian rules footballer playing for  in the AFL Women's (AFLW).

Early life
Lewis did professional Trampolining at national level for Australia until 2018. She played for Claremont Football Club in the WAFL Women's. She represented Western Australia at the 2019 AFL Women's Under 18 Championships, where she played 3 games and kicked 1 goal, and averaged 12 disposals.

AFLW career
On debut, she collected 11 disposals, 1 behind, 2 marks and 3 tackles. Lewis had an outstanding first season, and won the club's best first year player and best and fairest awards.

Statistics  
Statistics are correct to the end of round 3, 2021. 

|- 
| scope="row" text-align:center | 2021
| 
| 6 || 3 || 0 || 1 || 18 || 14 || 32 || 3 || 9 || 0.0 || 0.3 || 6.0 || 4.7 || 10.7 || 1.0 || 3.0 || 
|- class="sortbottom"
! colspan=3 | Career
! 3
! 0
! 1
! 18
! 14
! 32
! 3
! 9
! 0.0
! 0.3
! 6.0
! 4.7
! 10.7
! 1.0
! 3.0
! 0
|}

Honours and achievements
Individual
 AFL Women's Rising Star nominee: 2021

References

2002 births
Living people
West Coast Eagles (AFLW) players
Australian rules footballers from Western Australia